Olga Valerevna Stolbova (Russian - ) (born 6 April 1947) is a Russian and Soviet linguist, known for her work on the Chadic languages. She received her Doctor of Sciences in 1998. Stolbova is a senior research fellow at the Institute of Oriental Studies of the Russian Academy of Sciences and a representative of the Moscow School of Comparative Linguistics.

References

Living people
1947 births
Linguists from Russia
Women linguists
Moscow State University alumni